Adriaan van der Meyden was the two time Governor of Zeylan during the Dutch period in Ceylon. He was first appointed on 11 October 1653 and was Governor until 12 May 1660, when he was succeeded by Rijckloff van Goens. His second term lasted from 1661 to 1663.

Footnotes 

17th-century Dutch colonial governors
Governors of Dutch Ceylon